Akhbar Al Arab (in Arabic أخبار العرب meaning The News of the Arabs in English) is a daily newspaper published in Abu Dhabi.

History and profile
Akhbar Al Arab published by Al Wathba Publishing was founded in 1999. Ahmad Rateb Al Kheshen is the editor-in-chief of the daily.

The estimated circulation of the paper in 2003 was 35,000, making it the third in the country. Its 2008 circulation was 20.000 copies.

See also
List of newspapers in the United Arab Emirates

References

2000 establishments in the United Arab Emirates
Newspapers established in 2000
Daily newspapers published in the United Arab Emirates
Arabic-language newspapers
Mass media in Abu Dhabi